Gustav Plaut was born on 26 February 1824, the fifth child and third son of Herz C Plaut, and Caroline (née Blach), from Reichensachsen (near Eschwege) on the border between Thuringia and Hesse. He became a banker who funded trade with Russia and Poland as well a number of railways. He also rescued the King of Saxony’s gold and jewels  from the advancing Austrian army.

Life and career
Herz C Plaut, founded the  firm H C Plaut (Bankhaus H. C. Plaut), in 1815. as can be seen in the Nordhausen Directory of 1834, it is listed as a money-changer. The Nordhausen Weekly Journal (Nordhäusische Wöchentliche Nachrichtsblatt) contains an advertisement for the bank that offers to cash winnings from the Bavarian Premium Lottery, and also sell Prussian State Securities.

His father died in 1835 possibly from cholera in an epidemic exacerbated by conditions created by the wars of liberation. Gustav’s mother Caroline took over the running of the business. Gustav  left school and entered his mothers bank at the age of 14 as an apprentice, by 1850 he was a  partner. Four years later in 1854 he married Bertha Oppenheimer from the Hamburg branch of this family.

The Leipzig branch of the H. C. Plaut Bank financed trade with  Russia and Poland, in particular at the annual Leipzig Trade Fair. Later as the railway network spread the bank became involved with its finance for lines between  Leipzig to Erfurt and Nordhausen. His work with the railways led to his membership of the board of twelve railway companies. He also became a councillor (stadtverordneter) for the city of Leipzig.

As Gustav’s knowledge and circle of influence grew he  became a financial advisor to the rulers of Thuringen including  the Georg II, Duke of Saxe-Meiningen. The Duke offered Gustav the title of Adel (equivalent to Baron in English) for which he would have to pay a fee. After discussion with his son Hugo he declined the title. In 1866 during the wars of liberation, Gustav rescued the gold and jewels of the King of Saxony along with his manservant by hiding the treasure under a stack of potatoes covered by a tarpaulin on a horse drawn cart.

Aged 51 in 1874 Gustav Plaut retired from the bank and ceded control (In Prussia conditions for private banking had been favourable but the formation of the Reich permitted the foundation of new limited companies that made private banking less profitable.)   to his business partner Sieskind whose descendants ran the business until the Nazis closed it down.

References

1824 births
1908 deaths